"Paris to Tokyo" is a song by American rapper Fivio Foreign and Australian rapper and singer the Kid Laroi. It was released through Columbia Records as a single on July 8, 2022, and was added to Fivio's debut studio album, B.I.B.L.E., exactly one week later. The song was solely produced by SB and samples Far East Movement's 2010 single, "Rocketeer", which features Ryan Tedder. On July 1, 2022, exactly one week before the song was released, Fivio and Laroi performed it live for the first time at Wireless Festival in London.

Composition and lyrics
"Paris to Tokyo" is a drill song. Laroi sings the chorus, both before and after the sole verse that Fivio raps. Laroi leans away from his previous alternative pop releases and back into his hip hop roots.

Music video
The official music video for "Paris to Tokyo", directed by Chris Villa, premiered on Fivio's YouTube channel alongside the song's release on July 8, 2022. It sees him and Laroi partying in a club as they rap. As the title of the song suggests, the two artists actually travel from Paris to Tokyo, as they stand behind the Eiffel Tower in the former city and Fivio sports a Rhude outfit as he raps in an arcade in the latter city. The video also includes expensive fast cars and the two artists ad-lib each other's lyrics.

Credits and personnel

 Fivio Foreign – vocals, songwriting
 The Kid Laroi – vocals, songwriting
 Far East Movement
 Kev Nish – songwriting
 Prohgress – songwriting
 DJ Virman – songwriting
 J-Splif – songwriting
 The Stereotypes
 Jonathan Yip – songwriting
 Ray Romulus – songwriting
 Jeremy Reeves – songwriting
 Bruno Mars – songwriting
 Philip Lawrence – songwriting
 SB – production, songwriting
 Patrizio Pigliapoco – mixing
 Eric Lagg – mastering
 Tyler Chase – recording
 Joe Dougherty – engineering assistance

Charts

References

2022 singles
2022 songs
Columbia Records singles
Fivio Foreign songs
The Kid Laroi songs
Songs written by Fivio Foreign
Songs written by the Kid Laroi
Songs written by Jonathan Yip
Songs written by Ray Romulus
Songs written by Jeremy Reeves
Songs written by Bruno Mars
Songs written by Philip Lawrence (songwriter)